The Russian alphabet (or , more traditionally) is the script used to write the Russian language. It comes from the Cyrillic script, which was devised in the 9th century for the first Slavic literary language, Old Slavonic. Initially an old variant of the Bulgarian alphabet, it became used in the Kievan Rusʹ since the 10th century to write what would become the Russian language.

The modern Russian alphabet consists of 33 letters: twenty consonants, ten vowels, a semivowel / consonant, and two modifier letters or "signs" that alter pronunciation of a preceding consonant or a following vowel.

Letters

 An alternative form of the letter De (Д д) closely resembles the Greek letter delta (Δ δ).
 An alternative form of the letter El (Л л) closely resembles the Greek letter lambda (Λ λ).

Historic letters

Letters eliminated in 1917–18

Since its elimination in 1918, it has remained a political symbol of the old orthography.

Letters eliminated before 1750 

  corresponded to a more archaic  pronunciation, already absent in East Slavic at the start of the historical period, but kept by tradition in certain words until the eighteenth century in secular writing, and in Church Slavonic and Macedonian to the present day.
  and  derived from Greek letters xi and psi, used etymologically though inconsistently in secular writing until the eighteenth century, and more consistently to the present day in Church Slavonic.
According to linguistic reconstruction, both become irrelevant for East Slavic phonology at the beginning of the historical period, but were introduced along with the rest of the Cyrillic script. The uniotated  continued to be used, etymologically, until the sixteenth century. Thereafter it was restricted to being a dominical letter in the Paschal tables.
 The letter  was adapted to represent the iotated   in the middle or end of a word; the modern letter  is an adaptation of its cursive form of the seventeenth century, enshrined by the typographical reform of 1708.
 Until 1708, the iotated  was written  at the beginning of a word.

Although it is usually stated that the letters in the table above were eliminated in the typographical reform of 1708, reality is somewhat more complex.

Although praised by Western scholars and philosophers, it was criticized by clergy and many conservative scholars, who found the new standard too "Russified". Some even went as far as to refer to Peter as the Anti-Christ.

Lomonosov also contributed to the Russian standard language, developing a "High Style" with high influence of Church Slavonic, which was to be used in formal situations such as religious texts; as well as "Medium Style" and "Low Style", deemed for less formal events and casual writing. Lomonosov advocated for the "Medium Style", which later became the basis of the modern Russian standard language.

Consonants

Most consonants can represent both "soft" (palatalized, represented in the IPA with a ) and "hard" consonant phonemes. If consonant letters are followed by vowel letters, the soft/hard quality of the consonant depends on whether the vowel is meant to follow "hard" consonants  or "soft" consonants ; see below. A soft sign indicates  palatalization of the preceding consonant without adding a vowel.

However, in modern Russian six consonant phonemes do not have phonemically distinct "soft" and "hard" variants (except in foreign proper names) and do not change "softness" in the presence of other letters:  are always hard;  are always soft. (Before 1950 Russian linguists considered  a semivowel rather than a consonant.)

See Russian phonology for details.

Vowels

The Russian alphabet contains 10 vowel letters. They are grouped into soft and hard vowels. The soft vowels, either indicate a preceding palatalized consonant, or (with the exception of ) are iotated (pronounced with a preceding ) in all other cases. The IPA vowels shown are a guideline only and sometimes are realized as different sounds, particularly when unstressed.

Details about individual vowels 
 is an old Proto-Slavic close central vowel, thought to have been preserved better in modern Russian than in other Slavic languages. It was originally nasalized in certain positions: Old Russian  ; Modern Russian   ('rock'). Its written form developed as follows:  +  →  → .

 was introduced in 1708 to distinguish the non-iotated/non-palatalizing  from the iotated/palatalizing one. In native Russian words,  is found only at the beginnings of a few words  'this (is) (m./f./n.)',  'these',  'what a',  'that way',  'sort of', and interjections like  'hey') or in compound words (e.g. 'therefore' =  + , where  is the dative case of ). In words that come from foreign languages in which iotated  is uncommon or nonexistent (such as English),  is usually written in the beginning of words and after vowels except  (e.g. , 'poet'), and   after  and consonants. However, the pronunciation is inconsistent. But many other words are pronounced with :  (syekta — 'sect'),  (dyebyut — 'debut'). Pronunciation mostly remains unpalatalized, so   — Russian rendering of the English name 'Peter' is pronounced differently from   — colloquial Russian name of Saint Petersburg.

, introduced by Karamzin in 1797 and made official in 1943 by the Soviet Ministry of Education, marks a  sound that historically developed from stressed . None of the several attempts in the twentieth century to mandate the use of  have stuck.

Non-vocalized letters

Hard sign
The hard sign () acts like a "silent back vowel" that separates a succeeding "soft vowel" (but not ) from a preceding consonant, invoking implicit iotation of the vowel with a distinct  glide. Today it is used mostly to separate a prefix ending with a hard consonant from the following root. Until the 1918 reform, no written word could end in a consonant: those that end in a "hard" consonant in modern orthography then had a final .

This is normally spelled  (the hard counterpart to ) unless this vowel occurs at the beginning of a word, in which case it remains . This spelling convention, however, is not applied with certain loaned prefixes such as in the word  – , 'Pan-Islamism') and compound (multi-root) words (e.g.  – , 'high treason').

Soft sign
The soft sign () in most positions acts like a "silent front vowel" and indicates that the preceding consonant is palatalized (except for always-hard ) and the following vowel (if present) is iotated (including  in loans). This is important as palatalization is phonemic in Russian.

When applied after stem-final always-soft (but not ) or always-hard (but not ) consonants, the soft sign does not alter pronunciation, but has grammatical significance:
the feminine marker for singular nouns in the nominative and accusative; e.g.  ('India ink', feminine) cf.  ('flourish after a toast', masculine) – both pronounced ;
the imperative mood for some verbs;
the infinitives of some verbs (with  ending);
the second person for non-past verbs (with  ending);
some adverbs and particles.

Treatment of foreign sounds 
Because Russian borrows terms from other languages, there are various conventions for sounds not present in Russian.

For example, while Russian has no , there are a number of common words (particularly proper nouns) borrowed from languages like English and German that contain such a sound in the original language.

Numeric values 
The system was abandoned for secular purposes in 1708, after a transitional period of a century or so; it continues to be used in Church Slavonic, while general Russian texts use Indo-Arabic numerals and Roman numerals.

Diacritics 
The Cyrillic alphabet and Russian spelling generally employ fewer diacritics than those used in other European languages written with the Latin alphabet. The only diacritic, in the proper sense, is the acute accent  (Russian:  'mark of stress'), which marks stress on a vowel, as it is done in Spanish and Greek. Although Russian word stress is often unpredictable and can fall on different syllables in different forms of the same word, the diacritic accent is used only in dictionaries, children's books, resources for foreign-language learners, the defining entry (in bold) in articles on Russian Wikipedia, or on minimal pairs distinguished only by stress (for instance,  'castle' vs.  'lock'). Rarely, it is also used to specify the stress in uncommon foreign words, and in poems with unusual stress used to fit the meter.

The letter  is a special variant of the letter , which is not always distinguished in written Russian, but the umlaut-like sign has no other uses. Stress on this letter is never marked with a diacritic, as it is always stressed (except in some compounds and loanwords).

Since then, its usage has been mandatory. It was formerly considered a diacriticized letter, but in the 20th century, it came to be considered a separate letter of the Russian alphabet. It was classified as a "semivowel" by 19th- and 20th-century grammarians but since the 1970s, it has been considered a consonant letter.

Frequency

The frequency of characters in a corpus of written Russian was found to be as follows:

Keyboard layout

The standard Russian keyboard layout for personal computers is as follows:

However, there are several variations of so-called "phonetic keyboards" that are often used by non-Russians, where, as far as is possible, pressing an English letter key will type the Russian letter with a similar sound (A → А, S → С, D → Д, F → Ф, etc.).

Letter names
Until approximately the year 1900, mnemonic names inherited from Church Slavonic were used for the letters. They are given here in the pre-1918 orthography of the post-1708 civil alphabet.

The Russian poet Alexander Pushkin wrote: "The [names of the] letters that make up the Slavonic alphabet don't represent a meaning at all. However, since the names of the first few letters of the Slavonic alphabet seem to form readable text, attempts have been made to compose meaningful snippets of text from groups of consecutive letters for the rest of the alphabet.

Here is one such attempt to "decode" the message:

In this attempt only lines 1, 2 and 5 somewhat correspond to real meanings of the letters' names, while  "translations" in other lines seem to be fabrications or fantasies. For example, "" ("rest" or "apartment") does not mean "the Universe", and "" does not have any meaning in Russian or other Slavic languages (there are no words of Slavic origin beginning with "f" at all). The last line contains only one translatable word – "" ("worm"), which, however, was not included in the "translation".

See also 

Bulgarian alphabet
Computer russification
Cyrillic alphabets
Cyrillic script
Ukrainian Latin alphabet
Greek alphabet
Montenegrin alphabet
List of Cyrillic digraphs and trigraphs
Reforms of Russian orthography
Romanization of Russian
Russian Braille
Russian cursive (handwritten letters)
Russian manual alphabet
Russian Morse code
Russian orthography
Russian phonology
Scientific transliteration of Cyrillic
Serbian Cyrillic alphabet
Yoficator

Notes

References

Bibliography

Ivan G. Iliev. Kurze Geschichte des kyrillischen Alphabets. Plovdiv. 2015.  
Ivan G. Iliev. Short History of the Cyrillic Alphabet. 

Alphabet
Cyrillic alphabets
Alphabet

de:Kyrillisches Alphabet#Russisch